The School of Art, Architecture and Design, formerly the Sir John Cass School of Art, Architecture and Design, abbreviated as The Cass and nicknamed the Aldgate Bauhaus, is an art school in Aldgate that forms part of London Metropolitan University. It was established in its present form in 2012 from the merger of Sir John Cass Faculty of Art, Media and Design and the Faculty of Architecture and Spatial Design at London Metropolitan University, though it has a history stretching back to the 1800s via its various predecessor institutions. The school took its former name from philanthropist Sir John Cass (1661–1718), who helped establish funding for education in Aldgate and whose statue is displayed in the University: however, his name was removed from the institutional name in June 2020 because of his associations with the slave trade. The school is presently based at the University's refurbished Aldgate Campus which comprises three buildings, Goulston Street, Calcutta House and The Calcutta Small Annexe in Aldgate, London.

The school offers courses across a range of subject areas: art (encompassing fine art, photography, English, creative writing, theatre and performance practice), architecture (including spatial planning and urban design) and design, which includes 3D design (fashion, textiles, furniture, product and jewellery), interiors and visual communication. Courses are provided at all levels including short courses, foundation year, undergraduate and postgraduate programmes.

Learning through practice, playing with process and working with clients; students at the School gain real-world experience in both individual and collaborative projects, engaging with professionals, communities and companies. There is a strong emphasis in the teaching studios on socially engaged architecture, art and design applied to both local and global contexts. The many specialist facilities available to students include wood, metal, plastic workshops, darkrooms and digital manufacturing technology. The school's regular exhibitions, including the famous Summer Show, regularly attracts a large amount of audiences.

Studios
A studio or unit is a study group with a particular theme or focus taken by year two and three undergraduate art, architecture and design students and by postgraduate architecture students at The Cass as part of their studies. Studios are led by both academic staff and professional practitioners, sometimes linking to external organisations or project briefs. At the start of each academic year, the leaders of each studio present their studio's themes, position and approach to allow students to choose from a wide range of issues, methods of working and types of project. During the year the studios come together for major events such as Celebration Week – when students present work in progress to panels of external critics – and summer exhibitions.

Controversy over sale of Central House
Controversy erupted in late 2015 after London Metropolitan University unveiled plans to cut many of the Cass's signature programmes while moving the Cass from its traditional Aldgate location (which would be sold) to its Holloway campus; this plan attracted opposition from many of Britain's most renowned artists and designers. Senior members of the faculty, such as dean Robert Mull, resigned in protest over the decision and other initiatives, amid protests by students and staff. Despite the opposition, the sale went through in February the next year, though the building continued to be leased out to the university.

Location in Aldgate
In March 2019 London Metropolitan University formally announced that The Cass would remain in Aldgate. The decision, which was made following a series of discussions with students, staff, industry professionals and the local council, was formally ratified by the University's Board of Governors and announced to the School by the University's Vice-Chancellor Professor Lynn Dobbs

Name change
On 10 June 2020, the University announced that it would be dropping "Sir John Cass" from the school's institutional name with immediate effect. The school is now known as The School of Art, Architecture and Design, pending a further official name change. The decision was made in the wake of the George Floyd protests, and calls by the Black Lives Matter movement for the removal and revision of monuments and names commemorating historical figures connected with the slave trade. The Vice-Chancellor "apologise[d] that we haven't taken this step before now".

References

Education in the City of London
London Metropolitan University
Aldgate
Art schools in England
Educational institutions established in 2012
Art schools in London
Name changes due to the George Floyd protests
2012 establishments in England